Chicken fingers (also known as chicken goujons, chicken strips, chicken tenders, chicken nuggets or chicken fillets) are chicken meat prepared from the pectoralis minor muscles of the animal. These strips of white meat are located on either side of the breastbone, under the breast meat (pectoralis major). They may also be made with similarly shaped pieces cut from chicken meat, usually the breast, or sometimes just pulverized chicken flesh.

Chicken fingers are prepared by coating chicken meat in a breading mixture and then deep frying them, in a manner similar to the preparation of schnitzel. They are a very popular snack or main course due to their convenience and have become a staple across the United States. Chicken fingers are a popular fast-food snack in the U.S. Some of the most popular fast-food restaurants that sell chicken fingers include Raising Cane's Chicken Fingers, Chick-Fil-A, Church's Chicken, KFC, Popeyes, Zaxby's & Culver's.

Chicken tenders were first made in Manchester, New Hampshire at the Puritan Backroom in 1974. Restaurants in Savannah, Georgia, and Baton Rouge, Louisiana have challenged this claim with later assertions to the invention of chicken tenders, although the general consensus supports the claim in Manchester.

Mass production 
Chicken fingers are a mass-produced product in the United States of America. They gained popularity in the mid-to-late 1980s as an alternative fast food choice to chicken nuggets, since they retained more chicken meat. Production can involve coating chicken meat with spices, polyphosphate and breading or crumbs, flash-frying the product to hold the breading in place, and then freezing it prior to shipment for consumer, retail and commercial use. Tyson Foods is one such company that mass-produces chicken fingers. Some are manufactured with a specific flavor profile, such as with a Buffalo-style hot sauce flavor. They are also manufactured with flavors such as Honey BBQ and Parmesan Herb Encrusted.

Vegan chicken fingers 
In recent years, chicken fingers made without chicken and with plant-based ingredients have entered the market and are called vegan chicken fingers or vegan chicken nuggets. They are made from ingredients that include pea protein, soy protein, textured vegetable protein and wheat gluten.

Variants 
Chicken fingers are sometimes grilled rather than fried; they may accompany salads or pasta.

See also 
 Chicken and chips
 Chicken nuggets
 Fish fingers
 List of hors d'oeuvre
 
 Raising Cane's Chicken Fingers 
 Chicken as food

References

Works cited 
 
 “Fooddata Central Search Results.” FoodData Central, https://fdc.nal.usda.gov/fdc-app.html#/food-details/2108385/nutrients.
 “Crispy Chicken Strips.” Tyson® Brand, https://www.tyson.com/products/breaded-chicken-crispy-chicken-strips/.
 Jawad, Yumna Jawad, et al. “Grilled Chicken Tenders.” FeelGoodFoodie, 12 June 2021, https://feelgoodfoodie.net/recipe/grilled-chicken-tenders/.

External links
 

American chicken dishes
Appetizers
Convenience foods
Fast food
Deep fried foods
Fried chicken